Syed Abdul Latif Kazmi , often referred to as Barī Imām or Barī Sarkār (1617 – 1705), was a 17th-century Sufi ascetic from Punjab who was one of the most prominent Sufi of the Sunni school of thought. He is venerated as the patron saint of Islamabad, Pakistan. Born in Karsal, Chakwal District to a sayyid family. He is revered by all lovers of Sufi Saints, especially in the Indian Subcontinent, who are greatly attached to the Sufi traditions. The life of Bari Imam is known "essentially through oral tradition and hagiographical booklets and celebrated in Qawali songs of Indian and Pakistani Sufism.
In the present day, Bari Imam is one of the most popular and widely venerated saints of Punjab.

Biography
Bari Imam was eight years old when his family migrated from Karsal in Chakwal District to what is now Aabpara, Islamabad in Pakistan. Additionally, Syed Kasran in the Tehsil of Gujjar Khan is considered to be his Birthplace. His father, Syed Mehmood Shah, was a farmer. So he helped his father with farming and with his herd of animals until he was 12 years old. Then Bari Imam was sent to Ghorghushti in Campbellpur (now known as Attock, Punjab, Pakistan) where he stayed for two years to learn fiqh, hadith, logic, and other disciplines related to Islam, because at that time Ghorghushti was a great seat of Islamic learning.
According to some sources, he later married and had one daughter, though both his wife and daughter are said to have died prematurely. After their passing, Bari Imam began wandering the forests of the Hazara district in Khyber Pakhtunkhwa, where he spent twenty-four years as an ascetic.

Shah Abdul Latif also went to Central Asian states of that period and to the Islamic holy cities of Mecca and Madinah to learn about Islam and perform hajj.

'Chorepur' becomes 'Noorpur Shahan'
After his return to old India, he then decided to settle in the Nur Pur Shahan area (now known as Noorpur Shahan, Islamabad, Pakistan). At that time, this area was known to be a dangerous place (locally known as 'Chorepur') due to its reputation as full of bandits and killers who used to attack and rob trade caravans passing through this area headed towards Central Asian states. Over time, he succeeded in teaching these people about love, peace and harmony. Later Shah Abdul Latif came to be known as "Bari Imam".

Because Bari Imam Sarkar did not transmit any of his doctrines to writing; as such, it may be rightly presumed that he bequeathed all of his teachings orally.

Bari Imam was renowned in his own life for being an ascetic who subjected himself to great self-humiliation in the public sphere, "living among the pariahs and consciously exposing himself to the disdain of the people."

A celebrated miracle worker, Bari Imam is also described in regional lore as one through whom God performed many marvels to convince the local people of the truth of Islam; thus, some of the most popular miracles ascribed to him are his having caused water to gush forth from rocks and his having brought back to life the dead water buffaloes of a peasant who had earlier provided the saint with milk during his ten years of spiritual seclusion.

Shrine

A silver-mirrored shrine of Bari Imam is located in Noorpur Shahan, Islamabad. It was originally built by the Mughal emperor Aurangzeb, who revered Bari Sarkar, in the 17th century. It has since been renovated many times, and is now maintained by the Government of Pakistan. Until the 1960s, the shrine was famous for its urs celebration, when the death anniversary of the saint was commemorated and which was attended by hundreds of thousands of people each year (in one particularly populous year, the attendance is said to have been 1.2 million people).

On 27 May 2005, a suicide attack took place at the shrine of Imam Bari in which 20 people died and almost 70 were injured.

Forecast about Islamabad as the future capital
It was in the 17th century (about 300 years ago), when Hazrat Bari Imam resided in present-day Islamabad. He is said to have forecast back then about a capital of Islamic republic in this area in the coming future.

References

External links

 "Shrine of Shah Abdul Latif Kazmi (Bari Imam)" 
 "Mausoleum (Mazar) of Shah Abdul Latif (Bari Imam)" 
 Urs of Bari Imam
 Tomb of Bari Imam
 Bari Imam - A Great Sufi
 The Shrine of Bari Imam

1617 births
1705 deaths
Islamic philosophers
Muslim reformers
17th-century Muslim scholars of Islam
Sufi poets
Mughal Empire Sufis
Qadiri order
Islam in Islamabad
History of Islamabad
Sufi saints
Shrines in Pakistan
Punjabi Sufis
People from Islamabad